Yaremenko (Яременко) is a surname coming from given name Yarema. Notable people with this surname include:

 Illia Yaremenko (born 1997), Ukrainian Paralympic swimmer
 Yury Yaremenko (1935–1996), Soviet economist

See also
 

Ukrainian-language surnames